Cyber Vaar – Har Screen Crime Scene is and Indian crime thriller web series directed by Ankush Bhatt. Produced by Tanveer Bookwala under the banner of Ding Entertainment. It features Mohit Malik and Sanaya Irani. The series released 10 June 2022 on streaming platform Voot. and has 20 episodes as of 4 September 2022.

Cast

Main
Mohit Malik as ACP Akash Malik
Sanaya Irani as Ananya Saini

Recurring
Keshav Uppal as Tech Bro K
Neha Khan as Asha
Amitabh Ghanekar as Hau Sahib
Indraneel Bhattacharya as Mr. Roy 
Abhinav Shukla as Vikram; Akash 's Childhood Friend
Yuvika Chaudhary as Gauri;Ananya's Sister 
Naveen Saini 
Aashish Kaul
Gavie Chahal
Flora Saini

Reception
Archika Khurana from The Times Of India rated the series 2.5 out of 5 and overall praised the lead actors Mohit Malik and Sanaya Irani of the series.

Neha Farheen from Aaj Tak shared her critical review stating that the story of the web series is average.

References

External links

 Cyber Vaar on Voot

2022 Indian television series debuts
Hindi-language web series
Psychological thriller web series
Indian drama web series